Nyctimystes disruptus, also known the Madang big-eyed tree frog and Richard's big-eyed tree frog, is a species of frog in the subfamily Pelodryadinae, endemic to New Guinea.
Its natural habitats are subtropical or tropical moist montane forests, rivers, rural gardens, and heavily degraded former forest.

References

disruptus
Amphibians of Papua New Guinea
Amphibians described in 1963
Taxonomy articles created by Polbot